Pecanex-like protein 1 is a protein that in humans is encoded by the PCNX gene. The gene is found in Homo sapiens, and functions as a competitive endogenous RNA of S-phase kinase associated protein 2 in lung cancer.

References

Further reading